Saulkrasti Municipality is a municipality in Vidzeme, Latvia. The municipality was formed in 2009 by reorganization of Saulkrasti town with its countryside territory, with the administrative centre being Saulkrasti. In 2010 Saulkrasti parish was created from the countryside territory of Saulkrasti town. The population in 2020 was 6,735.

During the 2021 Latvian administrative reform, the previous municipality was merged with Sēja Municipality.

The total area of Saulkrasti municipality is 46.8 km². The administrative territory of Saulkrasti municipality is located on the coast of the Gulf of Riga, in the western part of Vidzeme. The territory of Saulkrasti municipality includes a coastal forest zone from the Lilaste River and the lake in the south to Zvejniekciems in the north. The administrative territory stretches for 17 kilometers. More than 6 thousand inhabitants are declared to live in the county. Along with the summer season, the population increases significantly, which is related to the beginning of the tourist season and the increase in the flow of horticultural cooperatives in the region. The distance from the center of Saulkrasti to Riga is 45 km, Limbaži - 47 km, Sigulda - 40 km, Salacgrīva - 58 km. The territory of the municipality is crossed by the international highway VIA Baltica. Four rivers flow through the county - Inčupe, Pēterupe, Ķīšupe and Aģe, which are symbolically depicted in the coat of arms of Saulkrasti municipality.

Population

Twin towns — sister cities

Saulkrasti is twinned with:
 Gnesta, Sweden
 Neringa, Lithuania
 Odolanów, Poland
 Radashkovichy, Belarus

Images

See also
Administrative divisions of Latvia

References

External links

 
Municipalities of Latvia
Vidzeme